Martell is a town in Pierce County, Wisconsin, United States. The population was 1,070 at the 2000 census. The unincorporated communities of Martell and Morton Corner are located in the town. The unincorporated community of Lawton is also located partially in the town.

Transportation
The town is located where U.S. Route 63 crosses the Rush River.

Geography
According to the United States Census Bureau, the town has a total area of 35.8 square miles (92.8 km2), all of it land.

Demographics
As of the census of 2000, there were 1,070 people, 382 households, and 297 families residing in the town. There were 391 housing units at an average density of 10.9 per square mile (4.2/km2). The racial makeup of the town was 99.16% White, 0.19% African American, 0.28% Asian, 0.09% from other races, and 0.28% from two or more races. Hispanic or Latino of any race were 0.28% of the population.

There were 382 households, out of which 39.3% had children under the age of 18 living with them, 69.1% were married couples living together, 4.2% had a female householder with no husband present, and 22.0% were non-families. 16.8% of all households were made up of individuals, and 5.5% had someone living alone who was 65 years of age or older. The average household size was 2.80 and the average family size was 3.17.

In the town, the population was spread out, with 27.7% under the age of 18, 6.8% from 18 to 24, 36.0% from 25 to 44, 22.3% from 45 to 64, and 7.2% who were 65 years of age or older. The median age was 36 years. For every 100 females, there were 100.4 males. For every 100 females age 18 and over, there were 104.8 males.

The median income for a household in the town was $54,539, and the median income for a family was $57,063. Males had a median income of $40,240 versus $26,324 for females. The per capita income for the town was $21,304. About 4.6% of families and 5.5% of the population were below the poverty line, including 7.2% of those under age 18 and 12.5% of those age 65 or over.

Notable people

 LaRoy Baird, North Dakota lawyer and politician, was born in Martell
 Randolph Edgar Haugan, Norwegian-American writer; was born in Martell
 William A. Kay, farmer and Wisconsin State Representative, was born in Martell

References

External links
Town of Martell, Wisconsin website

Towns in Pierce County, Wisconsin
Towns in Wisconsin